The role of the Auditor General of Malaysia is to aid accountability by conducting independent audits on the account of Federal Government, State Government and Federal Statutory Bodies as well as the activities of the Ministry/Department/Agency and Companies under the Federal and State Government.

According to Article 105 of the Federal Constitution, the Auditor General is appointed by the Yang di-Pertuan Agong on the advice of the Prime Minister after consultation with the Council of Rulers. The Auditor General is not subject to the authority of the Public Service Commission. The position of Auditor General can be re-elected if he resigns previously. However, he is not allowed to hold other positions at the same time at the Federal or State level.

List of Auditors General
Auditors General of the Federated Malay States / States of the Straits Settlement
William James Parke Hume (1906–1911)
F. W. Talbot (1911–1919)
George P. Bradney (1919–1931)
Auditors General of the Colonial Administration
George P. Bradney (1932–1936)
L. G. Corney (1936–1946)
Auditors of the Malayan Union
R. McDonald (1946–1947)
Director of Audit of the Federation of Malaya
R. McDonald (1948–1951)
C. W. S. Seed (1951–1954)
Auditors General of the Federation of Malaya
H. M. Watson (1957–1960)
Donald George Bompas (1960–1963)
Auditors General of Malaysia
Donald George Bompas (1963–1966)
S. Kandiah (1966–1969)
Mohd Zain Ahmad (1969–1975)
Ahmad Noordin Zakaria (1975–1986)
Ishak Tadin (1986–1994)
Mohd Khalil Mohd Noor (1994–2000)
Hadenan A. Jalil (2000–2006)
Ambrin Buang (2006–2017)
Madinah Mohamad (23 February 2017-2019)
Nik Azman Nik Abdul Majid (23 February 2019 - present)

Living former Auditors General
Mohd Khalil Mohd Noor 
Hadenan A. Jalil
Ambrin Buang

References

External links
 Former Auditors General

Government audit agencies in Malaysia
Government agencies established in 1906
Malaysian auditors
Government audit officials
1906 establishments in British Malaya